Ethmia plagiobothrae is a moth in the family Depressariidae. It is found in California, United States.

The ground color of the forewings is blackish gray. The ground color of the hindwings is white, although the apical area is rather broadly blackish, except the fringe which is white. Adults are on wing in February and March.

The larvae have been reared on Plagiobothrys nothofulvus.

References

Moths described in 1973
plagiobothrae